ROCC may refer to:

 Rocc opera stage director & designer
 R.O.C.C. the fictional G.I. Joe vehicle
 Receiver Operating Characteristic curve